Chaabi is a traditional music of Algiers (Algeria), formalized by El Hadj M'Hamed El Anka.

Originally from the Casbah, the music known as chaabi belongs to a tradition of recent origin. It emerged during the 1930s, and has lost none of its power of attraction up to the present time. Inspired by vocal traditions of Andalusi music, such as muwashshah, using its modes and rhythm. Chaabi means 'of the people', and it's very definitely the people's music, even in a country where Raï rules.

A typical song features mournful, Arabic/Berber vocals, set against an orchestral backdrop of a dozen musicians, with violins and mandolins swelling and falling to a piano melody and the clap of percussion beats. Chaabi is part of a deeply conservative tradition and its lyrics often carrying a strong moral message.

At first Chaabi remained a scandalous genre, thriving behind closed doors or in specific locations called "Mahchachat" (cannabis dens), where the admirer of this music would go to drink coffee, tea or smoke. By the late 1950s, however, it had become the people's music, played at weddings and religious festivals. Its main exponents included Oran based singer , El Hadj M'Hamed El Anka, the father of Chaabi, and Dahmane El Harrachi, composer of the classic tale of emigration Ya Rayah.

In 2011, Safinez Bousbia directed a documentary on chaabi music. It took over seven years to make, facilitate and track the reunion of the Jewish and Muslim members of a chaabi group from colonial Algiers known as El Gusto.

The best known chaabi singers 
The best known chaabi singers are as follows:
- Hadj Mrizek 
- Amer Ezzahi
- El Hachemi Guerouabi
- Boudjemaa el Ankis
- Kamel Messaoudi 
- Abdelkader Chaou
- Dahman El Harachi

Features of Chaabi 

What distinguishes this Algerian Chaabi are the sounds and poems, the sound represents a sad memory of times gone by or a heart-warming romantic emotion or sessions with friends or memories, which gives a beautiful background to the country of Algeria, and the words create wonderful pictures, today there are hundreds of music singers who are inspired by these Beautiful music that can be heard all over the world, and it is music that describes the reality of life and even includes tales and stories such as the stories of the prophet Mohamed and the religiouses.

References

External links
Ournia.com
Dead Reckoning (2011)  movie about this music

20th-century music genres
21st-century music genres
Algerian styles of music
Berber music